Bob Gordon (25 July 1930 – 21 March 1995) was a  Scotland international rugby union footballer. Gordon played as a Wing.

Rugby career

Amateur career

Wilson played for Edinburgh Wanderers.

Provincial career

Gordon played for Edinburgh District against Glasgow District in the 1950–51 season's Inter-City match.

Glasgow won the Inter-City match 11 - 3, the start of a run of 3 wins in the fixture. Despite the loss, The Glasgow Herald noted improvement in Gordon's game: 'There is less desperation in the play of Gordon than there was a year ago and his strong running and coolness in difficult situations almost produced two tries from poor chances.'

International career

He was capped for  6 times between 1951 and 1953, playing in 6 Five Nations matches.

References

1930 births
Scottish rugby union players
Scotland international rugby union players
Rugby union wings
Edinburgh District (rugby union) players
Edinburgh Wanderers RFC players
1995 deaths